Elaphostrongylus is a genus of parasitic nematodes in the family Protostrongylidae.

Species 
 Elaphostrongylus cervi Cameron, 1931
 Elaphostrongylus panticola Lubinov, 1945
 Elaphostrongylus rangiferi Mitskevich, 1958
 Elaphostrongylus alces Steen et al., 1989

Life cycle 
Intermediate hosts of Elaphostrongylus spp. are terrestrial gastropods and they include:
 Limax cinereoniger
 Malacolimax tenellus
 Succinea spp.
 Vitrina pellucida
 Zonitoides nitidus

Experimental hosts of Elaphostrongylus spp. can also be freshwater snails. For example Lymnaea stagnalis has been experimentally infected with Elaphostrongylus rangiferi.

Elaphostrongylus spp. causes cerebral nematodiasis. Definitive host include Cervidae: moose Alces alces, Cervus elaphus and reindeer Rangifer tarandus.

References 

Strongylida